Speakeasy is the third full-length album by Christian rock band Stavesacre. It was the band's final studio album to be released on Tooth & Nail Records. The band would later re-record "Keep Waiting", "Gold and Silver" and "Rivers Underneath" for the Collective compilation album, also released through Tooth & Nail.

Track listing
 "Minutemen" – 3:17
 "Sundown Motel" – 5:11
 "Keep Waiting" – 4:31
 "You Know How It Is" – 2:15
 "Rivers Underneath" – 6:12
 "Gold and Silver" – 5:11
 "Freefall (From Hand to Hand)" – 6:39
 "St. Eriksplan" [Part I] – 2:45
 "St. Eriksplan" [Part II] – 3:40
 "Disquiet" – 3:38
 "Fascination Street" – 4:05 (The Cure cover)
 "This Love" – 6:31

Personnel
 Mark Salomon – vocals
 Ryan Dennee – guitars
 Dirk Lemmenes – bass
 Sam West – drums
 Jeff Bellew – additional guitars

Charts
 No. 35 (Top Contemporary Christian) – 1999

References

Stavesacre albums
1999 albums
Tooth & Nail Records albums